The Decade is the second EP by American post-hardcore band Alesana. It was released in April 2014, and the release used a different stylization of lyrics compared to their past releases. This album was made to celebrate the 10 years as a band. This is Alesana's first and only release with Artery Recordings.

Track listing

Personnel
Dennis Lee - unclean vocals
Shawn Milke - lead vocals, piano, rhythm guitar
Patrick Thompson - lead guitar, backing vocals
Jake Campbell - rhythm guitar, backing vocals, lead guitar
Shane Crump - bass guitar, backing vocals
Jeremy Bryan - drums

Charts

Trivia

The song "Second Guessing" has a different name "Almost Famous" and was changed at the last second.
This is the second record with collaboration of guitarist Jake Campbell since his departure of the band in 2010, months later ending The Emptiness record and tour.

References 

2014 EPs
Alesana albums